Asher is a character in the Book of Genesis.

Asher may also refer to:

 Tribe of Asher, one of the biblical Twelve Tribes of Israel, founded by Asher
 Asher (name), a given name and surname
 Asher, Oklahoma, a town
 Asher Creek, a stream in Missouri, U.S.
 Asher Space Research Institute, a research center in Israel
 Asher Guitars & Lap Steels, a guitar manufacturer
 Asher (film)

See also 
 Ashers, locality in New Zealand